Melissa Margaret Horne is an Australian politician. She has been a Labor Party member of the Victorian Legislative Assembly since November 2018, representing the seat of Williamstown.

After being elected to parliament, Horne was immediately appointed the Minister for Public Transport and Minister for Ports and Freight in the second Andrews Ministry. In June 2020, she became the Minister for Consumer Affairs, Gaming and Liquor Regulation and Minister for Fishing and Boating, while losing her public transport portfolio. In June 2022, she also became Minister for Local Government and Minister for Suburban Development but losing her fishing and boating portfolio.

She is the daughter of former federal MP Bob Horne. Before her election, she worked as a communications director of the Level Crossing Removal Authority.

References

Year of birth missing (living people)
Living people
Australian Labor Party members of the Parliament of Victoria
Members of the Victorian Legislative Assembly
Women members of the Victorian Legislative Assembly
21st-century Australian politicians
21st-century Australian women politicians